Henry McCracken was a Northern Irish amateur football centre forward, best remembered for his time in the Irish League with Linfield. He scored a hat-trick on his only appearance for the Ireland amateur team in November 1925.

Personal life 
McCracken was one of four brothers who played Irish League football.

Honours 
Linfield
 Irish League (3): 1929–30, 1930–31, 1933–34
 Irish Cup (3): 1929–30, 1930–31, 1933–34

References

Association footballers from Northern Ireland
NIFL Premiership players
Association football forwards
Year of birth missing
Sportspeople from County Down
English Football League players
Northern Ireland amateur international footballers
Year of death missing
Irish League representative players
Newry City F.C. players
Charlton Athletic F.C. players
Linfield F.C. players
Portadown F.C. players